Basshunter is a Swedish singer, record producer and DJ. He tries to plan his performances at show but usually they are spontaneous. On 8 July 2006 he debuted in television during Sommarkrysset concert. In 2008 he said that he performed live at more than 600 shows in the United Kingdom. In April 2009 he said that the biggest crowd he ever played was 300,000 people at a festival and he played more than 25 concerts to more than 200,000 people. In October he said that he was doing 20 shows in a week after "Boten Anna" release. Between 2007 and 2009 he had three proposals to perform at Melodifestivalen. In 2013 he said thah he performed during 1,000 shows in seven years.

Concert tours

One-off concerts

Music festivals

Notes

References

External links
 

Basshunter
Live performances